Men's artistic gymnastics events at the 2019 Military World Games were held in Wuhan, China from 21 to 26 October 2019.

Medal summary

Medalists

Medal standings

Participating nations

  (3)
  (6)
  (6)
  (4)
  (6)
  (2)

References

External links
Results book

Military World Games
2019 in Chinese sport
Artistic gymnastics
2019